The 1987–88 DDR-Oberliga was the 39th season of the DDR-Oberliga, the first tier of league football in East Germany.

The league was contested by fourteen teams. BFC Dynamo won the championship, the club's last of ten consecutive East German championships from 1978 to 1988. BFC Dynamo also won the FDGB-Pokal, thereby becoming the second club after Dynamo Dresden to win the double in East Germany.

Andreas Thom of BFC Dynamo was the league's top scorer with 20 goals, with Thom also taking the seasons East German Footballer of the year award.

On the strength of the 1987–88 title BFC Dynamo qualified for the 1988–89 European Cup where the club was knocked out in an East-West German encounter by SV Werder Bremen in the first round. Sixth-placed club FC Carl Zeiss Jena qualified for the 1988–89 European Cup Winners' Cup as the seasons FDGB-Pokal runners-up and was knocked out by Sampdoria second round. Second-placed 1. FC Lokomotive Leipzig qualified for the 1988–89 UEFA Cup where it was knocked out by S.S.C. Napoli in the second round while third-placed Dynamo Dresden lost to VfB Stuttgart in the semi-finals.

Table									
The 1987–88 season saw two newly promoted clubs, Hallescher FC Chemie and F.C. Hansa Rostock.

Results

References

Sources

External links
 Das Deutsche Fussball Archiv  Historic German league tables

Ober
1987-88
1